Prince Hyomyeong (Hangul: 효명태자, Hanja: 孝明太子) was a Korean Royal Prince as the second son of Taejo of Goryeo and Lady Seongmu of the Pyeongsan Bak clan. His religion was Buddhism. He died early at a young age.

References

Korean princes
Year of birth unknown
Year of death unknown
10th-century Korean people